Mga Mata ni Anghelita (International title: Anghelita / ) is a 2007 Philippine television drama fantasy series broadcast by GMA Network. The series is an adaptation of a 1978 film of the same title. Directed by Gil Tejada Jr. and Khryss Adalia, it stars Krystal Reyes. It premiered on July 2, 2007 on the network's Telebabad line up replacing Asian Treasures. The series concluded on October 5, 2007 with a total of 70 episodes.

The series is streaming online on YouTube.

Cast and characters
Lead cast
 Krystal Reyes as Anghelita

Supporting cast
 Sheryl Cruz as Magdalena
 Marvin Agustin as Gabriel / Angelo / Kuba
 Tonton Gutierrez as Carlos / Solcar
 Paolo Contis as Martin
 Carmina Villarroel as Cristina Manresa
 Celia Rodriguez as Leticia Manresa / Rasfelina / Corazon
 Mark Herras as Abel
 Isabel Oli as Teresa

Recurring cast
 Pen Medina as Father Joseph
 Daniel Fernando as Isaac
 Jess Lapid Jr. as Major Alba
 Ryan Yllana as Bitong
 Robert Ortega as Luis
 Tuesday Vargas as Selya
 Alynna Asistio as Lisa
 Martin Delos Santos as Iboy
 Louise Joy Folloso as Adriana
 Lucy Torres as Birheng Maria

Guest cast
 Beth Tamayo as Linda
 Allan Paule as Marcelo
 Yayo Aguila as Beth 
 Eula Valdez as Bernice 
 Alicia Mayer as Delilah
 Isabella De Leon as Rhoda
 Jewel Mische as Madel
 Prince Stefan as Gener
 Renz Juan as Ivy
 Arnel Ignacio as Manager / Madam
 Ian Veneracion as Tiklawin / Mercus
 Francis Magundayao as Niknok

References

External links
 

2007 Philippine television series debuts
2007 Philippine television series endings
Fantaserye and telefantasya
Filipino-language television shows
GMA Network drama series
Television shows set in the Philippines